The 1996 Lunar New Year Cup was a football tournament held in Hong Kong over the first and fourth day of the Chinese New Year holiday.

Participating teams 
  Hong Kong League XI (host)

Results

Semifinals

Third place match

Final

Bracket

Top scorers 
2 goals
  Takuya Takagi
  Norio Omura

1 goal
  Motohiro Yamaguchi
  Kazuyoshi Miura
  Martin Pringle
  Niclas Alexandersson
  Mariusz Śrutwa

See also 
 Hong Kong Football Association
 Hong Kong First Division League

References 
 Carlsberg Cup 1996 at RSSSF
 XV. Carlsberg Cup Chinese New Years Tournament 1996 – Details, YANSFIELD (Archived)

1997
February 1996 sports events in Asia
1995–96 in Hong Kong football
1996 in Swedish football
1996 in Japanese football
1995–96 in Polish football